Al Aspen (June 5, 1893 in Philadelphia, Pennsylvania – 1956) was an American racecar driver.

Indy 500 results

References

1893 births
1956 deaths
Indianapolis 500 drivers
Racing drivers from Philadelphia